Dascyllus aruanus, known commonly as the whitetail dascyllus or humbug damselfish among other vernacular names, is a species of marine fish in the family Pomacentridae.

Description

Habitat
Associated with coral reefs, most usually in groups above Acropora coral heads. Males may be aggressive against other fish while they tend eggs.

Distribution
Whitetail dascyllus is widespread throughout the tropical waters of the Indo-Pacific region, Red Sea included. However, the species has recently been split with D. aruanus found in the Pacific and  Forsskål's 1775 name Dascyllus abudafur being resurrected for the Red Sea and Indian Ocean populations.

In aquaculture
They are called aquarium 'Starter fish' as they are quite tolerant of variable conditions and aid in conditioning the tank environment for less hardy fish. These fish have been reared in captivity. They can be territorial with other fish. The adult is quite aggressive.

References

aruanus
Fish of the Red Sea
Fish described in 1758
Taxa named by Carl Linnaeus